d'Alembert is a large lunar impact crater located in the northern hemisphere on the far side of the Moon, to the northeast of the somewhat smaller walled plain Campbell. Astride the southwest rim of d'Alembert is Slipher. To the north is the crater Yamamoto, and to the south-southwest lies Langevin. This walled plain has the same diameter as Clavius on the near side, making it one of the largest such formations on the Moon.

As with many lunar walled plains of comparable dimensions, the outer rim of this formation has been worn and battered by subsequent impacts. Besides Slipher, the most notable of these craters is d'Alembert Z intruding into the northern rim. There is also a small crater on the northwest inner wall that has a wide cleft in its eastern side, and a smaller crater along the southeastern inner wall. As eroded as the rim may be, its form can still be readily discerned as a roughly circular ridge line in the lunar terrain.

The interior floor of d'Alembert is a relatively level surface, at least in comparison with the rough terrain that surrounds the crater rim. It is marked with a number of small crater impacts, the largest being d'Alembert G and d'Alembert E toward the eastern rim. In the southwest, the floor is more irregular due to the outer rampart and layers of ejecta from Slipher. A pair of shallow clefts in the floor surface radiate away from this crater, beginning near the midpoint of d'Alembert and reaching half-way toward the inner wall.

Satellite craters
By convention these features are identified on lunar maps by placing the letter on the side of the crater midpoint that is closest to D'Alembert.

References

 
 
 
 
 
 
 
 
 
 
 
 

Impact craters on the Moon